Northpost Spire is a  peak in British Columbia, Canada.

Description
Northpost Spire is located in The Bugaboos, along the east side of the Vowell Glacier at the south end of Bugaboo Provincial Park. Precipitation runoff from Northpost's north slope drains into the headwaters of Vowell Creek → Bobbie Burns Creek → Spillimacheen River → Columbia River; and from the south slope to Cobalt Lake → Bugaboo Creek → Columbia River. The nearest higher neighbor is Brenta Spire,  to the south.

History
The peak's name was applied by James Monroe Thorington in 1930, and the toponym was officially adopted on November 15, 1962, by the Geographical Names Board of Canada. The first ascent of the summit was accomplished in 1938 by Dr. I. A. Richards and his wife Dorothy Pilley Richards. The first ascent of the north face was made on August 20, 1966, by Fred Beckey and Jerry Fuller.

Climate

Based on the Köppen climate classification, Northpost Spire is located in a subarctic climate zone with cold, snowy winters, and mild summers. Winter temperatures can drop below −20 °C with wind chill factors below −30 °C. This climate supports the Vowell Glacier below the peak's west slope.

See also
 The Bugaboos
 Geography of British Columbia

References

External links
 Northpost Spire: weather

Columbia Valley
Two-thousanders of British Columbia
Purcell Mountains
Kootenay Land District